Oncidium reflexum is a species of orchid endemic to southwestern Mexico.

Synonyms 
Oncidium funereum Lindl.
Oncidium pelicanum Lindl.
Oncidium suttonii Bateman ex Lindl.
Oncidium suave Lindl.
Oncidium macropterum A.Rich. & Galeotti
Oncidium wendlandianum Rchb.f.
Oncidium tayleurii Lindl.
Oncidium reflexum var. intermedium Regel
Oncidium acrochordonia Rchb.f. ex Kraenzl.
Oncidium liebmannii Rchb.f. ex Kraenzl.
Oncidium uncia Rchb.f. ex Kraenzl.
Oncidium durangense Hágsater

References

External links 

reflexum
Endemic orchids of Mexico